Brush Creek may refer to the following places in the United States:

California 
Brush Creek (Sonoma County, California)

Iowa 
Brush Creek (White Breast Creek), a stream in the Des Moines River catchment

Minnesota 
Brush Creek Township, Faribault County, Minnesota
Brush Creek, Minnesota, an unincorporated community

Missouri 
Brush Creek, Missouri, an unincorporated community
Brush Creek (Blue River tributary)
Brush Creek (Bourbeuse River tributary)
Brush Creek (Bryant Creek tributary)
Brush Creek (Fox River tributary)
Brush Creek (Gasconade River tributary)
Brush Creek (Lamine River tributary)
Brush Creek (Missouri River tributary)
Brush Creek (North Fork Salt River tributary)
Brush Creek (Osage Fork Gasconade River tributary)
Brush Creek (Sac River tributary)
Brush Creek (South Moreau Creek tributary)
Brush Creek (Thompson River tributary)

Montana 
Brush Creek (Montana), a stream in Flathead County

Nebraska 
Brush Creek (Niobrara River tributary), a stream in Holt County, Nebraska

North Carolina 
Brush Creek (Reedy Fork tributary), a stream in Guilford County
Brush Creek (Deep River tributary), a stream in Randolph and Chatham Counties

Ohio 
Brush Creek Township, Ohio (disambiguation), four different townships
Ohio Brush Creek

Oklahoma 
Brush Creek, Oklahoma, a census-designated place

Oregon 
Brush Creek (Curry County, Oregon)

Pennsylvania 
Brush Creek (Connoquenessing Creek tributary)
Brush Creek (Raystown Branch Juniata River tributary)
Brush Creek (Shaffer Creek tributary)
Brush Creek (Wills Creek tributary)
Brush Creek Township, Fulton County, Pennsylvania

Tennessee 
 Brush Creek, Sequatchie County, Tennessee
 Brush Creek, Smith County, Tennessee
 Brush Creek, Williamson County, Tennessee

Utah 
Brush Creek (Utah), a tributary of the Green River

Virginia 
Brush Creek (Banister River tributary), a stream in Halifax County, Virginia

West Virginia 
Brush Creek, West Virginia, an unincorporated community in Boone County
Brush Creek (Boone County), a stream 
Brush Creek (Cabell County), a stream 
Brush Creek (Kanawha County), a stream 
Brush Creek (Mercer County), a tributary of the Bluestone National Scenic River
Brush Creek (Monroe County), a stream 
Brush Creek (Wayne County), a stream

Wyoming  
Brush Creek (Medicine Bow National Forest), site of Brush Creek Work Center